Daniel Junas, also known as Dano Junas, (born January 16, 1962) is a Slovak actor, moderator, singer-songwriter and one-time Slovak Gramy Award winner.

Personal life
Junas was born in Bratislava, Slovakia.  His mother, Helen, was an opera singer, and his stepfather, Jan, was a singer and theater director.

He is married, for the third time, to Denisa Kralova now Junasova, has two daughters, Sandra and Daniela and planning some more with his actual wife.

Career
Junas began acting and singing as a teenager.  Shortly afterwards, he decided to pursue a career in acting when he was cast in a 1984 television show entitled Triangel.   During the 1990s, he ventured into the music industry, and has since made 8 albums, one winning a European Grammy.  Junas has also dabbled in modeling, landing campaigns for Ford, Honda and Kenvelo.

Also, Junas has been in musical theatre, performing in Grease and I love you, you're perfect, now change.

Filmography
Elisabeth's Yard
Plavcik a Vratko
Janosik
More than words
Playboy (1990)
Axe
Cage
Sklenikova Venusa (1986)

Television
Vášnivé známosti
Bakalari
Triangel
Goodness
Big Heart
Dj Show
Miss Czechoslovakia (1990 - host of the event)
Miss Slovakia (3 years - host of the event]
Queen of Slovakia (1997 - host of the event alongside Jennifer Rush, Matt Bianco and Paul Yong)
Ripley's Believe It or Not!
Have Fun with Martiner
Children to Children
European Grammy Award for one of his songs (1992)
Choice Awards host
Pacient

Radio
Rock FM (10 years of own talk show Trianglovna)
Fun Radio (6 years of own talk show DJ-Show)
Radio Koliba (4 years of own talk show DJ-Show II)

CD Albums
Let's Together (featuring Alexa)
Phantom into feather-bed
You are Flying in it With Me
Don't Sleep
Macho - Polygram
Perfect Copuple
Best of - Universal
Dreaming My Whole Life

CDs for Children
They Are Catching Us
It's Here Again
Everything is Flying
Beautiful Party
Far out Day
Far out Day II.
Arara Karao Circus
Teacher Destroyer
Did it Self (Samo Sato)
Where is this World Falling To
Name, City, Animal, Thing

References

http://www.bleskovky.sk/cl/15/228582/Dano-Junas-Autonehoda-
http://www.imdb.com/name/nm2645558/
http://www.cernak.sk/podsvetie-mafia/peter-steinhubel/
https://web.archive.org/web/20080318010038/http://www.honey-bunny.cz/andel-2007
http://www.linkedin.com/pub/0/2B9/055
http://www.supermusic.cz/skupina.php?idskupiny=17889&name=Junas
http://koktail.pravda.sk/sk_ksav.asp?r=sk_ksav&c=A050429_022444_sk_ksav_p20
http://www.bleskovky.sk/cl/15/55120/O%C2%A0vlasok_unikli_smrti_
https://web.archive.org/web/20071024011026/http://www.musicx.sk/news.php3?id=3264
http://webcache.googleusercontent.com/search?q=cache:B5I64vpG6fMJ:sozialmarie.org/admin/documents/177KinderFuerKinder_Sozialprojekt.pdf+dano+junas&hl=sk&ct=clnk&cd=15&gl=ca
http://www.lady.sk/index.php?kategoria=12&id=3565&PHPSESSID=6cbbd3949871e2aea49b9b328d9d12a6
https://web.archive.org/web/20071009125136/http://www.musicmedia.sk/main.php?s=3&lg=1&art=14
http://www.cassovia.sk/korzar/archiv/clanok.php3?sub=19.2.2001/15836K&title=Pom%E1da%20je%20pre%20Dana%20Junasa%20h%E1%E8ikom%20pre%20n%E1vrat%20sp%E4%9D%0D%0A

Slovak actors
Living people
1962 births
Slovak singer-songwriters